The Secretary for Health is a ministerial position in the Hong Kong Government, who heads the Health Bureau. The current office holder is Lo Chung-mau.

The position was created on 1 July 2022, following the reshuffle of the principal officials and reorganisation of the policy bureaux of the Hong Kong Government. It replaced the previous Secretary for Food and Health, and the portfolio with foods transferred to the Secretary for Environment and Ecology.

Before that, the Secretary for Health, Welfare and Food was created as a ministerial position who headed the Health, Welfare and Food Bureau (HWFB). It was replaced by Secretary for Food and Health on 1 July 2007, following the reshuffle of the principal officials and reorganisation of the policy bureaux of the Hong Kong Government. It replaced the previous Secretary for Health, Welfare and Food, and the portfolio with welfare transferred to the Secretary for Labour and Welfare.

The SH is a politically appointed position. In other words, its term expires when the Chief Executive leaves office. The secretary is also a member of the Executive Council (ExCo).

List of office holders
Political party:

Secretaries for Social Services, 1973–1983

Secretaries for Health and Welfare, 1983–1997

Secretaries for Health and Welfare, 1997–2002

Secretaries for Health, Welfare and Food, 2002–2007

Secretaries for Food and Health, 2007–2022

Secretaries for Health, 2022–Present

See also
Hong Kong Government
Government departments and agencies in Hong Kong

References

External links
Official website of the Food and Health Bureau
Organisation chart of Hong Kong Government

Food and Health, Secretary for
Medical and health organisations based in Hong Kong
Hong Kong